Beverly G. Kelley was the first woman to command a U.S. military vessel.

Background 
Kelley was raised in Miami, Florida and graduated from the University of Miami with a bachelor's degree in mathematics. In January 1976 she enlisted in the United States Coast Guard and then attended Officer Candidate School in Yorktown, Virginia from February through June 1976. She earned her master of arts degree in national security and strategic studies from the Naval War College in Newport, Rhode Island and a master of science degree in national resource management from the Industrial College of the Armed Forces in Washington, D.C.

Career 
Kelley became the first woman to command an American military vessel of any branch of the service, specifically a Coast Guard cutter, the 95-foot patrol boat , on April 12, 1979. In 1996, she was also the first woman to command a medium endurance cutter, . In 2000, she became commander of a high endurance cutter, and made history as the first woman ever to do so. She retired on April 22, 2006 at the rank of captain.

Later life 
Kelley was appointed to an open seat on the Queen Anne's County Board of Education by Maryland Governor Martin O'Malley in 2011. She was elected to the seat in November 2012, re-elected in November 2016 and continued to serve through 2020. Kelley served as president of the board during the 2018-2019 school year. She was not a candidate for re-election in November 2020.

Kelley became a member of the Defense Department Advisory Committee on Women in the Services in March 2013 and continued to serve on the committee through 2016.

Personal 
Kelley is married to Kevin M. Tokarski, who is Associate Administrator for Strategic Sealift at the United States Maritime Administration of the Department of Transportation. The couple have one son.

Honors 
Her military decorations during her thirty years of service include: 
 Three Meritorious Service Medals
 Three Coast Guard Commendation Medals
 Two Coast Guard Achievement Medals
 One Commandant's Letter of Commendation Ribbon
 Two Coast Guard Unit Commendation Awards
 Five Coast Guard Meritorious Unit Commendation Awards
 Two Joint Meritorious Unit Commendation Awards
 One Humanitarian Service Medal

References

Year of birth missing (living people)
Living people
University of Miami alumni
Naval War College alumni
Dwight D. Eisenhower School for National Security and Resource Strategy alumni
United States Coast Guard captains
People from Queen Anne's County, Maryland
County officials in Maryland